The X Mediterranean Games, commonly known as the 1987 Mediterranean Games, were the 10th Mediterranean Games. The Games were held in Latakia, Syria, from 11 to 25 September 1987, where 1,996 athletes (1,529 men and 467 women) from 18 countries participated. There were a total of 162 medal events from 19 different sports.

Participating nations
The following is a list of nations that participated in the 1987 Mediterranean Games:

Sports

Medal table

See also
Football at the 1987 Mediterranean Games

References

External links
International Mediterranean Games Committee
Mediterranean Games Athletic results at gbrathletics website

 
M
Sport in Latakia
M
Mediterranean Games, 1987
Multi-sport events in Syria
Mediterranean Games by year
Mediterranean Games